Gerald R. Sherratt (November 6, 1931 – July 8, 2016) was the mayor of Cedar City, Utah, and the president of Southern Utah University.

Early life
Gerald R. Sherratt was born on November 6, 1931 in Cedar City, Utah. Graduating from Branch Agricultural College (which would later become Southern Utah University) in 1951, Sherratt later received a bachelor's degree in elementary education and a master's degree in educational administration from Utah State University.

Career
Sherratt spent 16 years as the president of the Cedar City School from 1982 to 1997. Under his tutelage, enrollment increased from 1,800 in 1982 to 5,500 students in 1997.

Mayor of Cedar City
At the age of 70, Sherratt was elected to mayor of Cedar City in 2001.

References

1931 births
2016 deaths
Utah State University alumni
Mayors of places in Utah
Heads of universities and colleges in the United States
Southern Utah University people